Capitol is a German-style building game set in the ancient Roman Empire, designed by Aaron Weissblum and Alan R. Moon. The game was published by Schmidt Spiele in 2001. It was redeveloped into a quicker-playing card game named Clocktowers and published by Jolly Roger Games.

Gameplay 
Capitol is played in 4 rounds and each round is divided into 4 phases: Construction, Improvement, Scoring, and End phase. During the Construction phase the players are able to perform actions with their hand of building, roof, and permit cards.

 Building cards allow you to take 2 floors (small wooden blocks). You can add these to an incomplete building or create a totally new building.
 Roof cards allow you to complete a building by placing a round or triangular roof on your stack of floor blocks. Once your building is complete, you can place it onto the board with a Permit card.
 The permit card comes in three different flavors, pink, blue and purple each correlating to three sections of the board.

Once all the players have passed on playing cards, you then proceed to the Improvement phase. This is a very fast bidding phase in which players can win fountains, amphitheaters, or temples.

Then comes the Scoring phase, each of the 9 areas are scored by determining the first and second Players. The first Player in each area receives 2 points. If the area has a fountain, the first and second players receive an additional point. If the area has a temple, all of the points received are doubled.

The final phase is the End phase. Each player draws 6 cards, one at a time, from the face up stacks of building, roof, and permit cards. If an area has an amphitheater, the first player may draw 2 extra cards and the second player may draw one extra.

The player with the most points at the end of 4 rounds wins the game.

External links 

 

Board games introduced in 2001
Board games about history
Alan R. Moon games